Senator Meek may refer to:

Carrie Meek (1926–2021), Florida State Senate
Kendrick Meek (born 1966), Florida State Senate

See also
Senator Meeks (disambiguation)